Constituent Assembly elections were held in Venezuela on 25 July 1999, following a referendum in April on convening one. For the election two large coalitions were created; Patriotic Pole, which consisted of the Fifth Republic Movement, the Movement for Socialism, Fatherland for All, the Communist Party of Venezuela, the People's Electoral Movement and some other minor parties, and Democratic Pole consisting of Democratic Action, Copei, Project Venezuela and Convergencia. The result was a victory for Patriotic Pole, which won 121 of the 128 seats, whilst an additional three seats were taken by representatives of indigenous communities elected by indigenous associations. Each voter had 10 votes. Voter turnout was 46.2%.

Results

See also
 1999 Constituent National Assembly

References

1999 in Venezuela
Venezuela
Elections in Venezuela
Election and referendum articles with incomplete results